The Volunteer Regiment of Buda, was a World War II military force made up of prisoner of war (POW) volunteers from Hungary serving in the Soviet Red Army at the Battle of Budapest. They were organized into tank, artillery, and, presumedly, infantry troops. A division was organized but was not ready in time to participate in the siege. Approximately 600 men from this regiment were killed in action at Budapest. After the war the surviving members were again made prisoners, sent to the camp at Jászberény, and treated as POWs.

Another Hungarian regiment organized by the Soviets, the Kossuth Lajos Regiment, trained at the Talizi camp but was also ultimately disbanded and made POW in Ivanovo.

References

Sources

 Gosztony, Peter.  Stalins Fremde Heere, Bernard & Graefe Verlag, 1991. .

Military units and formations of Hungary in World War II
Regiments of the Soviet Union
History of Budapest
World War II prisoners of war held by the Soviet Union
Hungary–Soviet Union relations
Expatriate military units and formations
Volunteer military units and formations